Liam Griffin (born 1945 or 1947 in Rosslare, County Wexford) is an Irish former hurler and manager.  He played hurling at various times with his local clubs Rosslare and Newmarket-on Fergus with the Wexford and Clare senior inter-county teams in the 1960s.  Griffin later served as manager of the Wexford senior inter-county team from in 1995 and 1996. Later he was instrumental on the Hurling Development Committee that established the Christy Ring Cup and Nicky Rackard Cup for weaker hurling counties. In 2009 he was named in the Sunday Tribunes list of the 125 Most Influential People In GAA History.

Biography
Griffin was born in Rosslare, County Wexford in 1945 or 1947. His parents ran a guesthouse in the town before buying a small hotel nearby in the late 1950s.  Griffin was educated locally and later worked in his parents’ hotel.  In the 1960s he became the first member of his family to study hotel management at the Shannon College of Hotel Management and he later spent a decade working in various hotels in Wales, Switzerland and Ireland.  In the 1970s Griffin left the hotel industry and joined Bord Fáilte to gain experience in the wider tourism industry.  He later returned to buy his parents hotel in Rosslare at the end of the decade and began building up his business empire.  By the start of the 2000s the Griffin Group, run by Liam and two of his sons, controlled three hotels across the south-east coast of Ireland.

After finishing his playing and managerial careers in hurling Griffin later served as a pundit with RTÉ's The Sunday Game. In 2008 he became part of the analysis team on TV3's championship coverage and has been a regular hurling analyst on The Breakfast Show and The Right Hook on Newstalk radio for a number of years.

Playing career

Club
Griffin played his early club hurling with his local club in Rosslare and had some juvenile success.  After moving to Clare in the 1960s he joined the Newmarket-on Fergus club.  Here he played a key role in helping the club win three senior county titles in 1967, 1968 and 1969.

Inter-county
Griffin first came to prominence on the inter-county scene with the Wexford minor team.  He later played with the Clare under-21 team, however, he enjoyed little success with 'the Banner county.'  Griffin didn't continue playing after the under-21 grade.

Managerial career

Wexford
In spite of cutting his inter-county hurling career short Griffin became interested in coaching.  Since the early 1970s he coached juvenile teams in the Wexford area and in the early 1990s he completed a diploma in sport psychology.  In 1994 Griffin was appointed manager of the Wexford senior inter-county team, however, he wasn't the county board's first choice for the post.  He had earlier stood for election as manager of the Wexford minor team and was defeated twice.  Fate played a hand in Griffin taking the senior managerial position as some of the earlier favourites withdrew from the race and he got the job.  Wexford hurling was in the doldrums at the time as the team hadn’t won a senior All-Ireland title since 1968 or a senior Leinster title since 1977.

1995: First season
Griffin's first season in charge in 1995 saw little in the way of improvement.  In spite of introducing a strict diet and training regime his side were beaten by the minnows of Meath in the National Hurling League  while the team's championship preparations did not go to plan either.  Liam Dunne, the team captain, played a club match for Oulart-the Ballagh before the Leinster semi-final and was duly stripped of the captaincy.  This caused tensions between some of the players and Griffin.  The first outing in the championship saw Wexford fall by seven points to Offaly and Griffin was put under severe pressure.

1996: Leinster and All-Ireland successes
In 1996 Griffin made wholesale changes throughout the team and enforced his new training regime.  Clare’s All-Ireland victory in 1995 spurred on the so-called ‘weaker counties’ and Griffin tried to get his players to believe in themselves.  Griffin’s motivational techniques paid off as Wexford defeated Offaly to capture their first Leinster title in nearly twenty years.  Wexford later qualified to play in the All-Ireland final where Limerick, the defeated finalists of 1994, provided the opposition.  The Munstermen were slight favourites going into the match, however, Griffin’s side led by a point at half-time in spite of being reduced to fourteen players.  The team hung on in the second half to clinch a 1-13 to 0-14 victory, their first All-Ireland in 28 years.

In spite of guiding his native-county to an emotional championship title Griffin decided to retire as manager at the start of 1997 due to personal issues.

Promotion of hurling
In early 2000, Griffin said the GAA should be ashamed of itself over its failure in the promotion of hurling.

References

 Corry, Eoghan, The GAA Book of Lists (Hodder Headline Ireland, 2005).
 Walsh, Denis, Hurling: the Revolution Years (Penguin Ireland, 2005).

   

1947 births
Living people
Christy Ring Cup
Clare inter-county hurlers
Gaelic games administrators
Hurling managers
Newmarket-on-Fergus hurlers
Nicky Rackard Cup
People educated at De La Salle College Waterford
Rosslare hurlers
Wexford inter-county hurlers